The 2010–11 Boston College Eagles men's basketball team represented Boston College in the 2010–11 NCAA Division I men's basketball season. New head coach Steve Donahue, formerly of Cornell, took over the Eagles from former coach Al Skinner. The team played its home games at Conte Forum in Chestnut Hill, Massachusetts. The team finished 2010 with a 15–16 record, missing the 2010 NCAA Division I men's basketball tournament.

Pre-season

Recruiting

2010–2011 Roster

Departures from 2009–2010 Team
 Evan Ravenel, F – Transferred
 Rakim Sanders, G-F – Transferred
 Tyler Roche, F – Graduated

Roster

Rankings

Schedule

|-
!colspan=9 style=|Exhibition

|-
!colspan=9 style=|Regular season

|-
!colspan=9 style=| ACC tournament

|-
!colspan=9 style=| NIT

References

Boston College
Boston College Eagles men's basketball seasons
Boston College
Boston College Eagles men's basketball
Boston College Eagles men's basketball
Boston College Eagles men's basketball
Boston College Eagles men's basketball